Alexandre (also Alexander) Grigorievich Dinerchtein (Александр Григорьевич Динерштейн, born April 19, 1980) is a professional Go player from Russia. He is one of only a few non-Asian players to reach professional status, which he achieved in 2002 at the Hanguk Kiwon (Korean Professional Go Association). He has won the European Championship seven times between 1999 and 2009.

Biography

Early life 
Dinerchtein started playing go in 1986, when he was just 6 years old. He was born and raised in Kazan, Russia, where he grew up around strong Russian Go players, such as Ivan Detkov and Valeryi Solovyev. He first learned Go from his father. He was both a chess and Go player, but by the age of 10 he stopped playing chess and went deeper into Go with his new teacher Valery Shikshin.

Move to Korea 
In 1996, ten years after he started learning Go, he was invited by Cheon Poong-jo of the Hanguk Kiwon to study Go in Seoul. Dinerchtein moved to Korea in 1997 and started to live in one of the biggest Go schools. He studied Go with several young Korean players that have since risen to fame, including Pak Yeong-hun —whom he beat once in 1998—, Park Chi-eun, Lee Chang-ung and Ko Geuntae.

Becoming professional 

In 2002 Alexandre made history by becoming the first Russian Go player to be promoted to professional status, alongside Svetlana Shikshina. Both players were promoted by special recommendation, a feat achieved by very few non-Asian players. He has since started a career in teaching Go to western players.

List of Achievements 

 One of the very few non-Asian players to reach professional playing strength.
 Seven-time European Champion (1999, 2000, 2002, 2003, 2004, 2005, 2009)
 Winner of several top European events, including the European Ing Cup (2001, 2002), European Go Oza (2002, 2006, 2008) and European Masters (2005,2007).
 Dinerchtein defeated O Rissei, 9an professional and one of Japan's strongest players.

References 

Dinerchtein Homepage, including details of his early life and career.
European Go Database, official rating list of the European Go Federation in which Dinerchtein is one of the top players.
EGF Hall of Fame - Past Winners

External links
 Alexandre Dinerchtein's homepage, where he offers private Go lessons on KGS
 Insei League on KGS Main Go teaching project of Alexandre
 the Goama newsletter. Alexandre Dinerchtein is the main editor. 
 Go playing strength test by Alexandre Dinerchtein.
 Style of Go test by Alexandre Dinerchtein.
 Social Network for Go players created by Alexandre

1980 births
Living people
Russian Go players
Sportspeople from Kazan